La vallée des bannis, written by Tome and drawn by Janry, is the forty first volume in the Spirou et Fantasio series, and the ninth from the Tome & Janry team. The story was serialised in Spirou magazine before it was released as a hardcover volume in 1989.

Story
In La vallée des bannis, carried away by a furious torrent during their passage through Touboutt-Chan (from the previous story La frousse aux trousses), Spirou and Fantasio regain consciousness in the hostile environment of the "Valley of Banishment", their destination. Fantasio is soon infected by  a mosquito carrying a virus, making him act extremely crazy. He runs off into the wild, and Spirou is forced to begin exploration of the area with only Spip as a companion.

Spirou discovers the tragic destiny of the first people exiled in the valley, and while searching for other survivors and a way leading out of the valley, seeks a way to secure Fantasio's return and cure his state of madness.

References

Tome publications in Spirou and Janry publications in Spirou BDoubliées

External links
Spirou official site album index 

Spirou et Fantasio albums
Works originally published in Spirou (magazine)
Literature first published in serial form
1988 in comics
Comics set in Asia
Lost world comics